The vice-president of the Republic of Mauritius is the second-highest office of the Republic of Mauritius, after the president. Because Mauritius is a parliamentary republic, the vice-president functions as a ceremonial figurehead, elected by the National Assembly, as set out by the Constitution of Mauritius.

Overview
In the event of the death, resignation or removal of the president, the vice-president becomes acting president. The vice-president nevertheless cannot succeed to the presidency in case of dismissal, resignation or death of the head of state but he can be nominated by the parliament to succeed to the president and if elected, the term will start for a full mandate of five years.

List of vice-presidents
A list of vice-presidents, since Mauritius became a republic on 12 March 1992.

See also

 President of Mauritius
 Prime Minister of Mauritius
 Deputy Prime Minister of Mauritius
 Vice Prime Minister of Mauritius
 Government of Mauritius
 Governor of Mauritius

References

 
Lists of political office-holders in Mauritius
1992 establishments in Mauritius